The Psalms of Thomas (more correctly Psalms of Thom) are a set of 3rd-century Judeo-Christian psalms found appended to the end of a Coptic Manichaean psalm book, which was in turn part of the Medinet Madi Coptic Texts uncovered in 1928. The psalms were originally published in 1938 by C. R. C. Allberry. The meter and structure of the psalms suggest that they were originally written in Eastern Aramaic. There are 20 psalms in total. The themes and content of the psalms bear a considerable resemblance to the Hymn of the Pearl from the Acts of Thomas.

Authorship
Considerable controversy continues as to whether the Thomas or Thom referred to could be the Apostle Thomas, Mani's disciple, also called Thomas, or the Gnostic concept of the divine twin. This is because the latter is referred to in other parts of the Coptic Manichaean Psalm-book as a distinct person from the Apostle. The enigma has since deepened with the publication of the Cologne Mani-Codex in the 1970s, which showed that Mani himself came out of a baptizing Christian sect called the Elkasaites (= Elcesaites).

Mandaean parallels
In 1949, Torgny Säve-Söderbergh suggested that the psalms were largely based upon canonical Mandaean texts (despite Jesus being mentioned positively in two psalms). Säve-Söderbergh's work on the psalms demonstrating that Mandaeism did not derive from Manichaeism, as was formerly commonly believed. For instance, Psalm 13 has parallels with prayers 125, 129 (cf. Psalms of Thomas 13:1–8), and 155 (cf. Psalms of Thomas 13:37–45) in the Qolasta.

Säve-Söderbergh (1949) notes Mandaean parallels such as the following.

Psalms 1, 2, 6, 8, 12, and 14 have concluding formulae (e.g., on the victorious return of Light) that are similar to the Mandaean ʿniana ("response") prayers, which are Qolasta prayers 78–103.
Psalm 2 has parallels with Hymn 15 in Book 3 of the Left Ginza (both have "trembling demons" that were defeated).
In Psalm 5, the phrase "treasure of life" is a parallel of the Mandaean formula "I am a mana of the Great Life," a phrase often found in the numerous hymns of Book 2 of the Left Ginza. In Mandaic, mana has been variously translated as "mind," "nous," or "treasure." In Mandaeism, Simat Hayyi, the name of a female uthra, also literally translates as "Treasure of Life."
Psalm 6 directly corresponds with Qolasta prayer 66, which is in turn identical with Hymn 43 in Book 3 of the Left Ginza.
Psalm 8 has various Mandaean motifs, such as the capture of demons and the triumph of Light (e.g., chapter 15 in Book 2 of the Left Ginza).
In Psalm 12, phrases such as "the empty one" and "the laden one" have parallels with the end of chapter 47 of the Mandaean Book of John. In the same chapter, phrases such as "ears but would not hear" have parallels in Psalm 14.
Psalm 13 has parallels with Qolasta prayer 24 and hymns 2, 22, and 41 in Book 3 of the Left Ginza.
Coptic passage 220 (i.e., Psalm 13) is similar to Qolasta prayer 155, which is the first Saturday rahma (devotional) prayers.
In Psalm 14, Hylē's answer of co-existing opposites (e.g., "death and life") is similar to Ruha's answer to Dinanukht in Book 6 of the Right Ginza. Both texts also resemble the Nag Hammadi Gnostic poem The Thunder, Perfect Mind.
In Psalm 17, the "mockery litany," in which aspects of the transient material world are mocked, has parallels with chapter 12 of the Mandaean Book of John.
Psalm 18 enumerates the senses and limbs, with its text similar to chapter 15 of the Mandaean Book of John, Hymn 19 in Book 3 of the Left Ginza, and prayer 96 of the Qolasta (identical with Hymn 2 in Book 3 of the Left Ginza).

Van Bladel (2017) suggests that an equally plausible scenario is that of Manichaeism and Mandaeism both having borrowed the hymns from another common source, likely an Aramaic-speaking Judeo-Christian group in Mesopotamia such as the Elchasites.

References

External links
Translation of Psalms 1–12

3rd-century Christian texts
Mandaean texts
Manichaean texts
Texts in Coptic
Thomas the Apostle